El jardín de las delicias, also known as The Garden of Delights in English language cinema, is a 1970 Spanish drama film co-written and directed  by Carlos Saura.

The film was censored by contemporary Spanish censorship because of its Franco bourgeois satire and Spanish Civil War references.

Plot summary

Antonio Cano, 45 years old, is an important businessman who was severely injured in a car accident. Because of this, he is temporarily paralyzed and suffers memory loss. His family, friends and business associates all try to recreate scenes from his life in order to revive his memory which, little by little, does begin to return. Each day Antonio is placed in his beautiful garden where he relives many memories, both real and imagined.

The name is a reference to the Hieronymus Bosch painting The Garden of Earthly Delights.

Cultural significance

All of the striking scene changes and radical imagery are metaphors for the suppression and suffering of Spanish people in Francoist Spain, who could only speak out about their plight by means of allegorical films/stories such as El jardín de las delicias.

Cast
José Luis López Vázquez	 as	Antonio
Luchy Soto	as 	Luchy
Francisco Pierrá	as	Don Pedro
Esperanza Roy	as	Nicole
Antonio Acebal
Alberto Alonso as 	Tony
Eduardo Calvo
Antonio Canal	as	Friend 3
Lina Canalejas	as 	Tía
Roberto Cruz
Ignacio de Paúl
Luisa Fernanda Gaona
José Nieto	as	Friend 1
Yamil Omar
Mayrata O'Wisiedo	as 	Nurse
Julia Peña	as 	Julia
Luis Peña	as 	Friend
Marisa Porcel
Porfiria Sanchíz	as 	(voice) (as Porfiría Sanchís)
Charo Soriano	as 	Actress
Gloria Berrocal	as 	(uncredited)
Geraldine Chaplin	as 	(uncredited), she appears on church
Luis de Pablo	as 	(uncredited)

Reception
John Simon described The Garden of Delights as a 'near masterpiece'.

References

External links
 

1970 films
Spanish drama films
1970s Spanish-language films
1970 drama films
Spain in fiction
Films directed by Carlos Saura
Films produced by Elías Querejeta
Films scored by Luis de Pablo
Films with screenplays by Rafael Azcona
1970s Spanish films